Fernando Medina Maciel Almeida Correia (born 10 March 1973) is a Portuguese economist and politician Socialist Party (PS) who has been serving as Minister of Finance in the government of Prime Minister António Costa since 2022. He previously served as Mayor of Lisbon from 2015, succeeding Costa, to 2021.

Early life and education
Medina was born in Porto to Edgar Marciel Almeida Correia and Maria Helena Guimarães Medina. He has a degree in Economics from the Faculty of Economics of the University of Porto. He also holds a master's degree in Economic Sociology from the Instituto Superior de Economia e Gestão.

Political career

Early beginnings
During his time at university, Medina was the President of the Faculty's Students' Union and then the President of the Students' Unions' Federation of Porto. 

From 2000 to 2002, Medina served as adviser to Prime Minister António Guterres, first on education and science and later on economic policy. 

Following the 2005 national elections, incoming Prime Minister José Sócrates appointed Medina as Secretary of State for Employment and Professional Training, serving under Minister of Labor José António Vieira da Silva.

Mayor of Lisbon, 2015–2021
In June 2021, Medina faced calls for his resignation as a result of his government's decision of January 2021 to share the personal information of at least three Lisbon-based Russian dissidents with Russian authorities. In response, he ruled out stepping down and instead apologized for what he initially described as a "bureaucratic error". Afterwards, municipal authorities admitted that since 2011 Lisbon’s city hall had regularly disclosed the personal information of human rights activists, including "names, identification numbers, home addresses and telephone numbers", with several repressive regimes, including Angola, China and Venezuela. Portuguese President Marcelo Rebelo de Sousa described the situation as "deeply regrettable" and declared that everyone deserved to have their fundamental rights respected in a democratic country.

Medina lost his re-election bid in the 2021 local elections, and was succeeded as Mayor by Carlos Moedas.

Minister of Finance, 2022–present
After the Socialist Party's absolute majority victory in the 2022 Portuguese legislative election, he was sworn in as a member of parliament, and two days later, on March 30, 2022, was appointed Minister of Finance of the XXIII Constitutional Government. His first proposal for the government's 2023 budget, which aimed to further slash the deficit to 0.9% of GDP, was approved by parliament in November 2022.

Other activities
European Union organizations
 European Investment Bank (EIB), Ex-Officio Member of the Board of Governors (since 2022)

International organizations
 Asian Infrastructure Investment Bank (AIIB), Ex-Officio Member of the Board of Governors (since 2022)
 European Bank for Reconstruction and Development (EBRD), Ex-Officio Member of the Board of Governors (since 2022)
 Inter-American Development Bank (IAB), Ex-Officio Member of the Board of Governors (since 2022)
 Multilateral Investment Guarantee Agency (MIGA), World Bank Group, Ex-Officio Member of the Board of Governors (since 2022)
 World Bank, Ex-Officio Member of the Board of Governors (since 2022)

Personal life
Medina is married with two sons and a daughter. He plays the piano.

References

University of Porto alumni
Members of the Assembly of the Republic (Portugal)
21st-century Portuguese economists
Portuguese sociologists
1973 births
Socialist Party (Portugal) politicians
Mayors of Lisbon
People from Porto
Living people
Finance ministers of Portugal